Casa Vini Caldirola (or the Caldirola Wine House) sponsored an Italian professional road bicycle racing team between 1998 and 2004, with a gap in 2002, where the main sponsor was Tacconi Sport.  In 2005 the team was formally disbanded, but many riders continued in the new Liquigas-Bianchi UCI ProTour team.

Team name 

As professional racing teams change name with their sponsors, the name of the team has varied in its lifetime.

Notable riders

External links 

 Official site

Cycling teams based in Italy
Defunct cycling teams based in Italy
Cycling teams established in 1998
Cycling teams disestablished in 2004